Michael Ugwu (born 10 January 1999) is a Nigerian footballer who plays for Bohemians 1905 in the Czech First League.

Career

Ugwu started his senior career with Bendel Insurance. In 2019, he signed for Bohemians 1905 in the Czech First League, where he has made five appearances and scored two goals.

References

External links 
 Ugwu, nový objev Bohemians: Budu jedním z nejlepších útočníků v Česku 
 Chci být lepší než Lewandowski, říká nigerijský útočník Bohemians 
 Nadějný nigerijský talent ve službách Bohemky se chce stát jedním z nejlepších útočníků Fortuna ligy 
 iDNES.cz Profile

1999 births
Living people
Nigerian footballers
Expatriate footballers in the Czech Republic
Nigerian expatriate footballers
Bohemians 1905 players
Association football forwards
Bendel Insurance F.C. players